Eaton Chalk Pit is a  biological Site of Special Scientific Interest on the southern outskirts of Norwich in Norfolk. 

These former chalk mines are used by hibernating bats and the site has been monitored over a long period for research into bat ecology. Up to 40 bats use the mines and the main species are Daubenton's, Natterer's and brown long-eared bats.

There is no public access to the site.

References

Sites of Special Scientific Interest in Norfolk